The Paseo de César Chávez is a pedestrian paseo in Downtown San Jose, spanning across San Jose State University's campus.

History

Paseo de César Chávez was developed from 1994–96 by San Jose State University, along with the Paseo de San Carlos and the 9th Street Paseo, as a part of a major campus revitalization scheme. The paseo was created by the pedestrianization of San Carlos Street between 4th and 10th Streets. The paseo was named for famed California civil rights activist César Chávez.

Paseo de César Chávez was laid out to serve as the primary north-south pedestrian axis through San Jose State University's campus. It has since became an important focal point for events and gatherings on the SJSU campus.

In 2008, a memorial arch to César Chávez, namesake of the paseo, was unveiled by Dolores Huerta, noted California civil rights activist and contemporary of Chávez.

Location

Paseo de César Chávez is located in central Downtown San Jose. It spans across San Jose State University's campus, from San Salvador Street in the south to San Fernando Street in the north, and follows the former alignment of 7th Street.

The paseo intersects the Paseo de San Carlos, the main east-west axis on campus.

It is within walking distance of Paseo de San Antonio station and Santa Clara Street station, on the VTA light rail.

See also
Paseo de San Antonio
Paseo de San Carlos
9th Street Paseo

References

César Chávez
Pedestrian malls in the United States
Downtown San Jose